Pressigny may refer to the following places in France:

Pressigny, Haute-Marne, a commune in the Haute-Marne department 
Pressigny, Deux-Sèvres, a commune in the Deux-Sèvres department